The Lafayette Avenue station is a local station on the IND Fulton Street Line of the New York City Subway. Located under Lafayette Avenue and Fulton Street in Brooklyn, it is served by the C train at all times except nights, when the A train takes over service.

Despite the station's name, there are no entrances on Lafayette Avenue; the nearest entrance is a block away.

History
This underground station opened on April 9, 1936, and replaced the BMT Fulton Street El. The Lafayette Avenue El station, which was formerly above the current subway station, closed on May 31, 1940.

Station layout

This station has four tracks and two side platforms. Both platforms have stairs that lead up to a long mezzanine and fare control. There is no free crossover or crossunder between the two platforms, due to the shape of the mezzanine's fare control area.

Both platform walls have a light green trim line with a dark green border and mosaic name tablets reading "LAFAYETTE AVE." in white sans-serif lettering on a dark green background with light green border. Small tile captions reading "LAFAYETTE" in white lettering on a black background run below the trim line. Emerald green I-beam columns run along the station mezzanine, but none are present at platform level.

East of this station there is a storage/lay up track between the two express tracks. The west end connects to the northbound express track, and the east end connects to the southbound express track, so trains must reverse in order to enter the layup track. At both ends, the storage/lay up track also ends at bumper blocks. There are also switches in both directions from the respective local to the respective express tracks; express trains cannot switch to the local tracks at these switches, however.

The station is located very close to the Fulton Street station on the IND Crosstown Line. Passengers on northbound local trains can see the station on the right just after leaving Lafayette Avenue. There is an employee-only connection between the two stations via the subway tunnels.

Exits
All exits serve both platforms. At the west end, there are stairs to all four corners of Fulton Street and South Portland Avenue. At the east end, there are stairs to four out of the six corners of the intersection of Fulton Street, South Oxford Street, and Hanson Place. There are two stairs to the northern corner, one to the northeastern (via a passageway), one to the southeastern, and one to the southwestern.

Nearby points of interest 
 Barclays Center
 Brooklyn Academy of Music
 Brooklyn Technical High School
 Fort Greene Park
 Irondale Center
 Mark Morris Dance Center
 MoCADA

References

External links 

 
 Station Reporter — C Train
 The Subway Nut — Lafayette Avenue Pictures
 Portland Avenue entrance from Google Maps Street View
 Oxford Street entrance from Google Maps Street View
 Hanson Place entrance from Google Maps Street View
 Greene Avenue entrance from Google Maps Street View
 Platforms from Google Maps Street View

IND Fulton Street Line stations
New York City Subway stations in Brooklyn
Railway stations in the United States opened in 1936
1936 establishments in New York City
Fort Greene, Brooklyn